Richard Butler, 1st Earl of Arran (1639–1686) was Lord Deputy of Ireland from 1682 to 1684 while James Butler, 1st Duke of Ormonde, his father, the Lord Lieutenant, was absent in England. He sat in the Irish House of Lords as Earl of Arran and in the English one as Baron Butler of Weston. When William Howard, 1st Viscount Stafford was accused of treason during the Popish Plot, Arran braved the anti-Catholic hysteria and voted not guilty.

Birth and origins 

Richard was born on 15 July 1639, probably in Ireland. He was the fifth son of James Butler and his wife Elizabeth Preston. His father was then the 12th Earl of Ormond but would be elevated to marquess and duke. His father's family, the Butler dynasty, was Old English and descended from Theobald Walter, who had been appointed Chief Butler of Ireland by King Henry II in 1177.

Richard's mother was a second cousin once removed of his father as she was the granddaughter of Black Tom, the 10th Earl of Ormond. Her father, however, was Scottish, Richard Preston, 1st Earl of Desmond, a  favourite of James I. Both his parents were Protestants. They had married on Christmas Day 1629.

Richard was one of ten siblings, but five of his brothers died in early childhood. He, his three surviving brothers and two sisters, are listed in his father's article.

Early life 
In June 1647 Richard, together with James Dillon, 3rd Earl of Roscommon, was given as hostage to the English Parliament by his father. On 13 May 1662 he was created Baron Butler of Cloughgrennan, Viscount Tullogh and Earl of Arran (having purchased the Aran Islands) in the Peerage of Ireland, with a special remainder to his younger brother John, should his own male line fail. This precaution would prove inefficient as his younger brother died before him.

Marriages and children 
Arran, as he was now, married twice. Both brides were rich heiresses. In September 1664 he married Mary Stuart, Baroness Clifton in her own right, daughter of James Stuart, 1st Duke of Richmond and 4th Duke of Lennox. She died in 1668 childless at the age of 16 and was buried in St Canice's Cathedral, Kilkenny.

He married secondly Dorothy, daughter of John Ferrers of Tamworth Castle and his wife Anne, daughter of Sir Dudley Carleton.

Richard and Dorothy had four children:
James (1674–1676), died in infancy
Thomas (1675–1681), died in infancy
Charlotte (1679–1725), his only surviving child and heiress, who married Charles, 4th Baron Cornwallis
Thomas (1681–1685), died in infancy

Later life 
On 27 August 1673, as a reward for his bravery in the sea fights against the Dutch in the Third Anglo-Dutch War, Arran was also created Baron Butler of Weston in the Peerage of England.

In 1680, when the Catholic William Howard, 1st Viscount Stafford was tried for high treason in the bogus Popish Plot, Arran was one of 31 peers who voted not guilty. As the most junior English peer, Arran was the first to cast his vote; his vote of "not guilty" took some courage, given the prevailing hysteria whipped up against anyone who cast doubt on the veracity of the supposed plot. However, 55 peers voted guilty and Stafford was executed.

Arran was made Lord Deputy of Ireland in April 1682 when his father, the Lord Lieutenant of Ireland, travelled to England, and held the post until August 1684 when his father returned. This honour came to him because his elder brother Ossory, who had been deputy from 1668 to 1669 had died in 1680.

Death and timeline 
Arran died of pleurisy in London on 25 January 1686 and was buried in Westminster Abbey. As he died without surviving male issue, and his brother John had died before him, his titles became extinct. His only daughter, Charlotte, inherited the estate, which she brought her husband when she married Lord Cornwallis in 1699.

However, his three Irish titles would be recreated in 1693 for his nephew Charles Butler, who would be created Baron Butler of Cloughgrenan, Viscount Tullough, and Earl of Arran of the 1693 creation.

Notes and references

Notes

Citations

Sources 

 
  – 1660 to 1690
 

  – Marriages, baptisms and burials from about 1660 to 1875
  – N to R (for Ossory under Ormond)
  – Ab-Adam to Basing (for Arran)
 
  – England
  – Scotland and Ireland
 
  – (for timeline)
  – Viscounts (for Butler, Viscount Mountgarrett)

External links 

http://www.pepysdiary.com/p/5826.php

1639 births
1686 deaths
17th-century Irish people
Richard
Earls of Arran (Ireland)
Lords Lieutenant of Ireland
Peers of Ireland created by Charles II
Peers of England created by Charles II
Younger sons of dukes